Alexandra Virina Scott  (born 14 October 1984) is an English sports presenter, pundit, and former professional footballer who mostly played as a right-back for Arsenal in the FA WSL. She made 140 appearances for the England national team and represented Great Britain at the 2012 Summer Olympics.

At club level, Scott has had three separate spells with Arsenal, punctuated with a season at Birmingham City in 2004–05 and three years in the American Women's Professional Soccer (WPS) with Boston Breakers. She scored the winning goal for Arsenal in the 2007 UEFA Women's Cup Final.

In 2019, Scott was inducted to the English Football Hall of Fame. , Scott is a pundit for BBC Sport and Sky Sports and was featured during the 2018 FIFA World Cup and 2019 FIFA Women's World Cup. She also covers the English Premier League.

Early life
Alexandra Virina Scott was born on 14 October 1984 in Poplar, East London, to a British mother with Northern Irish, English and Lithuanian-Jewish heritage and a Jamaican father. During the filming of the BBC's Who Do You Think You Are? in 2021, she discovered that her maternal great-grandfather was a Jewish person who opposed fascism in East London, and that her 4× great-grandfather, a black man, owned 26 slaves.

Scott attended Langdon Park School which has been granted Sports College status.

In 2022, Scott revealed in her autobiography that she had been a victim of domestic abuse from her father during her childhood; she pledged that all proceeds from her book would go to help women affected by similar abuse.

Club career

Start in England
Scott signed on with Arsenal in 1992, at the age of eight. After breaking into the first team as a striker or right winger, she was later converted to full-back. Scott remained with Arsenal until the 2004–05 season, after which she moved to Birmingham City. With the addition of Scott, the club finished fourth in the FA Women's Premier League National Division. However, due to Birmingham's financial difficulties, she returned to Arsenal for the 2005–06 season.

Upon rejoining Arsenal, Scott helped the club to a domestic double of the FA Women's Premier League and FA Women's Cup. She was also a key figure in Arsenal's historic "Quadruple" season in which they won all of their trophy competitions, including the 2006–07 UEFA Women's Cup. Arsenal were the first ever British side to win the competition, with Scott scoring the only goal in the two-legged tie with Umeå IK. She appeared in 22 Premier League games, scoring two goals. In all competitions, she made 40 appearances and scored four goals.

The 2007–08 season saw Scott appear in 21 games, scoring once. In all competitions, she made 35 appearances, scoring three goals. In the 2008–09 season, Scott scored once in 13 games. In all competitions, she made 24 appearances, adding two goals.

Move to the United States

Upon the creation of a new women's league in the United States, Women's Professional Soccer, it was announced on 25 September 2008 that her WPS playing rights had been assigned to Chicago Red Stars, whose head coach was former Arsenal assistant Emma Hayes. Her rights were traded on 15 January 2009 to Boston Breakers and it was announced on 6 February 2009 that she would be leaving Arsenal to join up with her new team.

In the inaugural 2009 Women's Professional Soccer season, Scott played in 17 games for the Breakers. She scored one goal and added one assist. In 2010, Scott featured in 21 games and registered two assists. She started 14 of her 15 matches in 2011. In December 2011, Scott returned to Arsenal on loan for the duration of a three-match pre-season tour of Japan.

Back to England
When the WPS collapsed ahead of the 2012 campaign, Scott returned for a third spell at Arsenal. She was joined by Boston teammate Kelly Smith. Scott was named captain for the 2014–15 season. She did not take part in the 2015 Continental Cup final where Arsenal Ladies beat Notts County to the Cup. In the following season, Scott helped take Arsenal to the final of the 2016 FA Cup against Chelsea, which the Gunners won 1–0. Scott played her last game on 12 May 2018 against Manchester City Women which Arsenal won 2–1.

International career

England
Scott competed at the U19 and U21 levels for England, including at the 2002 FIFA U-19 Women's World Championship in Canada.

Scott made her full debut against the Netherlands on 18 September 2004. She played in the 2005, 2009, 2013 and 2017 editions of the UEFA Women's Championship, as well as the 2007, 2011 and 2015 FIFA Women's World Cups. She won silver at the 2009 UEFA Women's Euros and bronze at the 2015 FIFA Women's World Cup.

In November 2014, Scott headed powerfully past her own goalkeeper to give Germany the lead in England's crushing 3–0 defeat at Wembley Stadium.

On 2 September 2017, Scott retired from international football. On the date of retirement, she ended up as the second most capped England player with 140 appearances.

Great Britain Olympics
In June 2012, Scott was named in the 18-player Great Britain squad for the 2012 London Olympics, where the British team finished 5th.

Media career
Scott began her media career while still playing football, appearing on programmes such as Soccer AM with other minor roles at BBC Sport, BT Sport, and Sky Sports. While playing for Arsenal, she completed a degree in Professional Sports Writing and Broadcasting at Staffordshire University. She wrote a weekly women's football column in the Morning Star newspaper, and a column in The Independent during the 2014 FIFA World Cup.

In 2016 she appeared in Bear Grylls' ITV show, Mission Survive, which she won.

Following her retirement in 2017, Scott turned her focus full-time to television broadcasting, co-presenting on Match of the Day Kickabout. She became well known to a wider audience when she covered the 2018 FIFA World Cup, becoming the first female football pundit at a World Cup for the BBC. After the tournament, she continued to provide insight on the Premier League, and in August 2018 became the first female pundit on Sky Sports, joining the Super Sunday team. She covered the 2019 FIFA Women's World Cup for the BBC. In August 2019, Scott was announced as the new co-host of Sky Sports' Goals on Sunday alongside Chris Kamara.
Since 2020, Scott has been a regular presenter on the BBC Sports Personality of the Year Awards. Scott is also a frequent guest presenter on The One Show.

From September 2019  Scott was a contestant on the 17th series of Strictly Come Dancing, paired with professional dancer Neil Jones. The couple were eliminated in week 11, coming fifth.

Scott has spoken out repeatedly about the sexist abuse she frequently receives on social media because of her role as a football pundit.

In May 2021, Scott was announced as the new presenter of Football Focus, after Dan Walker's decision to step down. In July 2021, Scott was announced as the host of a new BBC daytime quiz show, The Tournament, which began airing in November. That same month (July), Scott was announced as a commentator for the EA Sports game FIFA 22. She was a main presenter for the BBC's coverage of the 2020 Olympic Games alongside Clare Balding.

Scott participated in the ancestry research programme Who Do You Think You Are?, which aired from October 2021 onwards.

Her autobiography How (Not) To Be Strong was published on 29 September 2022.

Shortly after 7 European national football associations announced that they were asking their captains not to wear the pro-LGBTQ+ OneLove armband at the 2022 FIFA World Cup, due to a threat of sporting sanctions from FIFA, Scott wore the armband while reporting on the England vs Iran match on 21 November.

On 10 March 2023, following the suspension of Gary Lineker as the host of Match of the Day for allegedly breaching BBC impartiality rules by criticising the government's asylum policy on Twitter, Scott sent a Bernie Sanders meme "nah not me" to indicate she would not present the following episode of the show in solidarity with Lineker.

Personal life
In 2011, Scott founded the Alex Scott Academy in partnership with Kingston College and Puma, for female footballers aged 16–19 years. This represented the first such academy in the UK and was intended to highlight the growth of the women's game.

Scott was appointed Member of the Order of the British Empire (MBE) in the 2017 New Year Honours for services to football, she invited her mother, grandmother and niece to her investiture at Buckingham Palace and surprised her family with afternoon tea at the Ritz. She received an honorary  doctorate from the University of Hertfordshire in 2021.

Scott and former partner, and teammate,  Kelly Smith shared a house in Hertfordshire. The pair were teammates in America while both played for the Boston Breakers. Both returned to England to play for Arsenal together in 2012, after the collapse of their American league. In her 2022 memoir How (Not) To Be Strong, Scott confirmed that she and Smith were a couple from 2005 to 2013. While she says she fell “madly and deeply in love” with Smith, Scott has not explicitly labelled her sexuality and has said she has been in relationships with both men and women.

Career statistics

International
Scores and results list England's goal tally first, score column indicates score after each Scott goal.

Honours 
Arsenal
 FA WSL: 2012
 FA WSL Cup: 2012, 2013, 2015
 FA Women's Premier League: 2003–04, 2005–06, 2006–07, 2007–08, 2008–09
 FA Cup: 2003–04, 2005–06, 2006–07, 2007–08, 2012–13, 2013–14, 2015–16
 FA Women's Premier League Cup: 2006–07, 2008–09
 FA Women's Community Shield: 2006, 2008
 UEFA Women's Champions League: 2006–07

England
 FIFA Women's World Cup third place: 2015
 UEFA Women's Championship runner-up: 2009
 Cyprus Cup: 2009, 2013, 2015

Orders and special awards
 2017: Member of the Order of the British Empire (MBE)

See also 
 List of England women's international footballers
 List of women's footballers with 100 or more international caps
 List of football personalities with British honours
 List of FIFA Women's World Cup broadcasters
 List of FIFA World Cup broadcasters
 List of Strictly Come Dancing contestants

References

Further reading
 Aluko, Eniola (2019), They Don't Teach This, Random House, 
 Caudwell, Jayne (2013), Women's Football in the UK: Continuing with Gender Analyses, Taylor & Francis, 
 Clarke, Gemma (2019), Soccerwomen: The Icons, Rebels, Stars, and Trailblazers Who Transformed the Beautiful Game, 
 Dunn, Carrie (2019), Pride of the Lionesses: The Changing Face of Women's Football in England, Pitch Publishing (Brighton) Limited, 
 Dunn, Carrie (2016), The Roar of the Lionesses: Women's Football in England, Pitch Publishing Limited, 
 Grainey, Timothy (2012), Beyond Bend It Like Beckham: The Global Phenomenon of Women's Soccer, University of Nebraska Press,

External links

 
 Alex Scott at TheFA.com
 Alex Scott at Arsenal.com
 
 
 
 

1984 births
Living people
2007 FIFA Women's World Cup players
2011 FIFA Women's World Cup players
2015 FIFA Women's World Cup players
Arsenal W.F.C. players
BBC television presenters
Birmingham City W.F.C. players
Black British sportswomen
Black British television personalities
Boston Breakers players
England women's international footballers
England women's under-23 international footballers
English association football commentators
English autobiographers
English expatriate sportspeople in the United States
English expatriate women's footballers
English game show hosts
English people of Irish descent
English people of Jamaican descent
English people of Lithuanian-Jewish descent
English women's footballers
Expatriate women's soccer players in the United States
FA Women's National League players
FIFA Century Club
Footballers at the 2012 Summer Olympics
Footballers from Poplar, London
Members of the Order of the British Empire
Morning Star (British newspaper) journalists
Olympic footballers of Great Britain
Television personalities from London
UEFA Women's Euro 2017 players
Women's association football fullbacks
Women's Professional Soccer players
Women's Super League players
British LGBT footballers
Association footballers' wives and girlfriends